Goriška Vas pri Škocjanu is a small village in the Municipality of Škocjan in southeastern Slovenia. Within the municipality, it belongs to the Village Community of Zagrad. The area is part of the historical region of Lower Carniola. The municipality is now included in the Southeast Slovenia Statistical Region.

Name
The name of the settlement was changed from Goriška vas to Goriška vas pri Škocjanu in 1953.

Church
The local church is dedicated to Saints Hermagoras and Fortunatus and belongs to the Parish of Škocjan. It is a medieval building that was restyled in the Baroque in the first half of the 18th century.

References

External links
Goriška Vas pri Škocjanu at Geopedia

Populated places in the Municipality of Škocjan